Torroella may refer to:

Torroella de Fluvià, municipality in the comarca of Alt Empordà
Torroella de Montgrí, municipality in the comarca of Baix Empordà